The United Workers Union (UWU) is an Australian trade union. Described as the biggest blue-collar union in Australia, the UWU covers more than 150,000 workers within over 45 industries, including warehousing, defence, hospitality, health, disability support, early childhood education, aged care, logistics and supermarket supply, cleaning, security, farming, manufacturing, and market research. The union is the result of a merger of two unions: United Voice and the National Union of Workers. It is a member of the Labor Left.

The union is unique in its structure, having only one centralised federal branch which is not separated into state branches.

History

In 2018, plans began to merge the two the unions United Voice and National Union of Workers. In June 2019, the Fair Work Commission approved a vote on the proposed merger between the two unions held in August 2019. On 30 August 2019 the Australian Electoral Commission declared the result of the vote, with just over 95% of members supporting the amalgamation.

Governance and structure
The organisation operates as a national structure and does not have divisions or branches. Governance of the organisation is vested in a National Convention of approximately 500 Delegates, from industries and workplaces across Australia, elected by all financial members. A meeting of the convention is held every 4 years.

Between meetings of the National Convention its powers are exercised by a Member Council, consisting of 50 rank and file Councillors and the National Executive. Both the Councillors and the National Executive are elected by and from the convention.

The Committee of Management of the organisation is called the National Executive. It consists between 12 and 24 members, including the National President, National Secretary and 4 National Vice-Presidents.

Elections for all office positions within the organisation are conducted by the Australian Electoral Commission.

The term of office for all offices is 4 years.

Tim Kennedy, former National Secretary of the NUW, is the National Secretary, and Jo-anne Schofield, former National Secretary of United Voice, is the National President.

Industrial coverage
The UWU have industrial coverage over:

 Aged care, home care & disability support
 Cleaners
 Property Services
 Security
 Early Childhood Educators
 Teacher's aides and education assistants
 Farm workers
 Food manufacturers
 Poultry workers
 Dairy workers
 Restaurants, bars and cafes
 Casino workers
 Clubs
 Pub workers
 Ambulances & Paramedics
 Health Workers
 Health and Fitness workers
 Logistics and supermarket supply
 Manufacturing
 Market research & call centre workers
 Sales workers
 Tourism
 Veterinary, zoos & animal care
 Laundries
 Sports & entertainment workers

Politics
During the 2020 recession, the UWU pushed for "a universal income of $740 a week" and a "jobs guarantee".

References

External links
Official Website
Official Facebook page
Official Twitter page

Trade unions in Australia
General unions